Goggin Ice Arena was a 2,850-seat hockey rink in Oxford, Ohio. It was formerly home to the Miami University RedHawks ice hockey team.  It was built in 1976, and renamed on October 11, 1984, in honor of Lloyd Goggin, former school vice president, who was instrumental in building the arena.  The building also housed the school's synchronized skating program, club teams, local youth hockey, and the nation's largest summer hockey camp.  Possibly the arena's most popular feature was a 3/4 recreational sheet of ice used primarily for public skating and intramural broomball games.

In 2006, the team moved into the new Goggin Ice Center.

External links
 Goggin Ice Arena at MURedHawks.com

Defunct college ice hockey venues in the United States
Defunct ice hockey venues in Ohio
Indoor ice hockey venues in the United States
Miami RedHawks men's ice hockey
Buildings and structures of Miami University
1976 establishments in Ohio
Sports venues completed in 1976
2006 disestablishments in Ohio
Sports venues demolished in 2006